The Boxing at the 1973 Southeast Asian Peninsular Games was held between 4 and 7 September at Kentonmen Reserve Police Station, Queenstown.

Medal summary

Medal table

References
 
 
 

1973 Southeast Asian Peninsular Games
Boxing at the Southeast Asian Games